St. Joseph's Cathedral is the seat of the Apostolic Vicar of Southern Arabia and is one of the four Catholic churches in the Emirate of Abu Dhabi besides St. Paul's Church in Musaffah, St. Mary's Church in Al Ain and St. John the Baptist Church in Ruwais. The first church was built in 1962 in the present Corniche on a plot of land donated by Sheikh Shakhbut, the ruler of Abu Dhabi.

Masses are conducted in various languages, reflecting the population of expatriates in the country, primarily English but also Arabic, Tagalog, Malayalam, Sinhalese, Urdu, Konkani, Tamil, and French.

History 
The foundation for St. Joseph's Cathedral was laid in 1962. In October 1963, work began for the First Church in Abu Dhabi, and the foundation stone was blessed in February 1964, on a plot of land along the present Corniche, donated by Shakhbut bin Sultan Al Nahyan, the ruler of Abu Dhabi at that time. Fr. Barnabas Madii undertook the task of constructing the Church and a residence for the priests, and on 19 February 1965, the first church was inaugurated. A school was opened on the same plot in 1967 and was called St Joseph's School.

On 19 March 1981, the foundation for the present church was laid, following the ruler’s decision that the Church and its associated schools be moved to a different location. The inauguration of the new complex took place on 25 February 1983, in the presence of Sheikh Shakhbut. On 25 February 1983, the Church became a cathedral serving as the seat of The Vicar Apostolic of Southern Arabia with the late Giovanni Bernardo Gremoli as resident bishop.

On 30 January 2005, upon Gremoli's retirement, Paul Hinder was ordained as bishop.

The parish today has over 100,000 expatriate Catholics from all over the world. With the growing economy within the region, the Church also witnessed a steady increase in the number of faithful. Masses are celebrated in several different languages, and the church is generally seen packed to full capacity at most services.

The Bishop's House and St Joseph's School are located within the same compound and recently there has been some renovation.

A significant section of the parish complex was demolished at the beginning of 2013 to give way for the construction of new halls/ catechetical rooms/ offices/ residence for priests and staff, Today this newly constructed part is known as St. Therese of The Child Jesus Church. 

On 2 July 2022, Msgr. Paolo Martinelli was canonically installed as the Vicar of Southern Arabia in the cathedral as a successor to Msgr. Paul Hinder.

Papal visit 

On 5 February 2019, Pope Francis made a private visit to the cathedral. He addressed the people summoned to visit him, mainly consisting of the needy, people of determination and altar servers. He entered the church with the Vicar of Southern Arabia, Paul Hinder.

Clergy

Present and past parish priests

Mass timing

Sunday Mass 
 6:30 AM
 8:30 AM (Catechism Mass)
 10:15 AM
 12 AM (Tagalog)
 2:30 PM (Malayalam)
 4:30 PM
 6:30 PM
 8:15 PM (Arabic)

Daily Mass schedule

Monday To Friday 
 6:30 AM
 9:00 AM
 7:00 PM

Saturday 
 6:30 AM (Weekday liturgy)
 8:30 AM (Catechism Mass | Sunday liturgy)
 10:15 AM (Sunday liturgy)
 4:30 PM (Sunday liturgy)
 6:30 PM (Sunday liturgy)

Please note that mass times can change on holy days.

References

External links 

Religion in Abu Dhabi
Buildings and structures in Abu Dhabi
Roman Catholic cathedrals in the United Arab Emirates
Roman Catholic churches completed in 1962
Christian organizations established in 1962
20th-century Roman Catholic church buildings
Apostolic Vicariate of Southern Arabia
Catholic Church in the Arabian Peninsula